Mollywood may refer to:
 Malayalam cinema, a sector of the Indian film industry
 Marathi cinema, a sector of the Indian film industry
 Mormon cinema
 Mollywood (Galaxy Studios), a film funding company based in Mol, Belgium

See also
 Molly Wood (born 1975), American journalist
 Welcome to Mollywood (disambiguation)